The following events related to sociology occurred in the 1840s.

1840
Pierre-Joseph Proudhon's What is Property? is published.

1841

 Auguste Comte published Volume 5 of The Course of Positive Philosophy: La Partie Historique De La Philosophie Sociale

1842
Auguste Comte publishes Volume 6 of The Course in Positive Philosophy: Le Complément De La Philosophie Sociale Et Les Conclusions Générales, completing the series. 
Auguste Comte's Sociologie Comme Instruction Affirmative is published
Auguste Comte's Social Statics and Social Dynamics is published

1843
Søren Kierkegaard's Either/Or is published in two volumes.
John Stuart Mill's A System of Logic, Ratiocinative and Inductive is published in two volumes.

1844
Friedrich Engels' Outline of A Critique of Political Economy is published
Engels and Marx's The Holy Family is published
Karl Marx's Economic and Philosophic Manuscripts are written.
Max Stirner's The Ego and Its Own is published in German.

1845
Friedrich Engels' Conditions of the Working Class in England (original German edition) is published

1846
Marx and Engels' The German Ideology is written.
Pierre Joseph Proudhon's The System of Economic Contradictions or the Philosophy of Poverty is published
Søren Kierkegaard's Two Ages: A Literary Review is published

1847
Friedrich Engels' The Principles of Communism is written during October–November
Karl Marx's The Poverty of Philosophy is published, a critique of Proudhon's 1846 work.

1848
Engels and Marx's The Communist Manifesto is published
Study group on the social question held attended by Frederic Le Play, Jean Reynaud, Lamartine, François Arago, Carnot, Lanjuinais, Tocqueville, Montalembert, Sainte-Beuve, Agénor de Gasparin, Abbé Dupanloup, Adolphe Thiers, Auguste Cochin, Charles Dupin and others

1849
Søren Kierkegaard's The Sickness Unto Death is published.

References 

Sociology
Sociology timelines